In the mathematical field of functional analysis, a nuclear C*-algebra is a C*-algebra  such that for every C*-algebra  the injective and projective C*-cross norms coincides on the algebraic tensor product    and the completion of  with respect to this norm is a C*-algebra. This property was first studied by  under the name "Property T", which is not related to Kazhdan's property T.

Characterizations

Nuclearity admits the following equivalent characterizations:

 The identity map, as a completely positive map, approximately factors through matrix algebras. By this equivalence, nuclearity can be considered a noncommutative analogue of the existence of partitions of unity.
 The enveloping von Neumann algebra is injective.
 It is amenable as a Banach algebra.

Examples 
The commutative unital C algebra of (real or complex-valued) continuous functions on a compact Hausdorff space as well as the noncommutative unital algebra of  real or complex matrices are nuclear (cf. here).

See also

References

C*-algebras
Functional analysis
Operator theory

it:C*-algebra#C*-algebra nucleare